Athagada Patna is a village in Ganjam district, Odisha, India.

Villages in Ganjam district